Shifting Gears is the debut studio album by American DJ Z-Trip. It was released through Hollywood Records in 2005. It includes guest appearances from Soup, Whipper Whip, Lyrics Born, Busdriver, Supernatural, Luke Sick, Murs, Aceyalone, Mystic, Chester Bennington, and Chuck D.

Critical reception
David Jeffries of AllMusic gave the album 3.5 stars out of 5, describing it as "a reminiscing album that is in love with a time when breakdancers and b-boys ruled and living without your Adidas was just impossible." Bill Werde of Rolling Stone gave the album 4 stars out of 5, saying, "These fifteen original tracks deploy sharp sampling, jazzy scratches and the sheer joy of old-school hip-hop."

Track listing

Charts

References

External links
 

2005 debut albums
Albums produced by Z-Trip
Hollywood Records albums